This is an index of articles in jurisprudence.

 A Failure of Capitalism
 Alf Ross
 American Society for Political and Legal Philosophy
 Analytical jurisprudence
 Anarchist law
 Antinomianism
 António Castanheira Neves
 Archon
 Argumentation theory
 Aristotle
 Arthur Linton Corbin
 Auctoritas
 Bartolomé de las Casas
 Basic norm
 Basileus
 Biblical law
 Biblical law in Christianity
 Boris Furlan
 Bruno Leoni
 Cafeteria Christianity
 Carl Joachim Friedrich
 Carl Schmitt
 Cautelary jurisprudence
 Charles de Secondat, baron de Montesquieu
 Compact theory
 Constitutionalism
 Conventionalism
 Corelative
 Costas Douzinas
 Critical legal studies
 Critical race theory
 Czesław Znamierowski
 Daniel N. Robinson
 Decisionism
 Declaration of Delhi
 Declarationism
 Dignitas (Roman concept)
 Director primacy
 Discourse ethics
 Divine command theory
 Dualism (law)
 Duncan Kennedy (legal philosopher)
 Earth jurisprudence
 Emerich de Vattel
 Ernesto Garzón Valdés
 Ethical arguments regarding torture
 Expounding of the Law
 Eye for an eye
 Felix Kaufmann
 Feminist legal theory
 First possession theory of property
 Francesco D'Andrea
 François Hotman
 Freedom of contract
 Friedrich von Hayek
 Fritz Berolzheimer
 Geojurisprudence
 Georg Wilhelm Friedrich Hegel
 George Buchanan
 German Historical School
 Giorgio Del Vecchio
 Global Justice or Global Revenge?
 Gottfried Leibniz
 Gray Dorsey
 H. L. A. Hart
 Habeas corpus
 Hans Kelsen
 Hans Köchler
 Hart–Dworkin debate
 Hart–Fuller debate
 Herman Oliphant
 Homo sacer
 Hozumi Nobushige
 Hugo Grotius
 Immanuel Kant
 Imperium
 Indeterminacy debate in legal theory
 International Association for Philosophy of Law and Social Philosophy
 International legal theory
 Interpretivism (legal)
 Interregnum
 Jean-Étienne-Marie Portalis
 Jeremy Bentham
 John Austin (legal philosopher)
 John Finnis
 John Locke
 John Macdonell (jurist)
 John Rawls
 Joseph H. H. Weiler
 Joseph Raz
 Juan de Mariana
 Julius Binder
 Jurisprudence
 Justice
 Justitium
 Labor theory of property
 Law and economics
 Law and Gospel
 Law and literature
 Law as integrity
 Law in action
 Law of Christ
 Law, Legislation and Liberty
 Laws (dialogue)
 Learned Hand
 Legal Education and the Reproduction of Hierarchy
 Legal formalism
 Legal humanists
 Legal moralism
 Legal naturalism
 Legal origins theory
 Legal pluralism
 Legal positivism
 Legal process (jurisprudence)
 Legal realism
 Legal science
 Legalism (Chinese philosophy)
 Legalism (theology)
 Legalism (Western philosophy)
 Leon Petrazycki
 Letter and spirit of the law
 Libertarian theories of law
 Lon L. Fuller
 Lorenzo Peña
 Manuel de Lardizábal y Uribe
 Mark Wrathall
 Metaconstitution
 Monarchomachs
 Monism and dualism in international law
 Monopoly on violence
 Muhammad Hamidullah
 Mutual liberty
 Natural justice
 Natural law
 Natural order (philosophy)
 Natural-law argument
 Naturalization
 New Covenant
 New legal realism
 Nicolas Barnaud
 Norm (philosophy)
 Oliver Wendell Holmes, Jr.
 Organic law
 Original intent
 Original meaning
 Pandectists
 Paternalism
 Paul Johann Anselm Ritter von Feuerbach
 Pauline privilege
 Peter Gabel
 Petrus Cunaeus
 Philippe de Mornay
 Philosophy of copyright
 Plato
 Political jurisprudence
 Political naturalism
 Political sociology
 Polycentric law
 Positive law
 Positivism
 Postglossator
 Prediction theory of law
 Principles of Islamic jurisprudence
 Prohibitionism
 Public policy doctrine (conflict of laws)
 Purposive theory
 R. Kent Greenawalt
 Radomir Lukić
 Rechtsstaat
 Restorative justice
 Retributive justice
 Richard Posner
 Robert Alexy
 Robert P. George
 Roberto Mangabeira Unger
 Ronald Dworkin
 Rule by decree
 Rule of Faith
 Rule of law
 Scepticism in law
 Soft law
 Soft tyranny
 Sovereignty
 State of emergency
 State of exception
 Stephen Guest
 Strict constructionism
 Supersessionism
 Textualism
 The Case of the Speluncean Explorers
 The Concept of Law
 The Golden Rule
 Theodor Sternberg
 Theodore Beza
 Therapeutic jurisprudence
 Thomas Hobbes
 Tony Honoré
 Torture
 Transitional justice
 Translating "law" to other European languages
 Underdeterminacy (law)
 Unitary executive theory
 Virtue jurisprudence
 Wesley Alba Sturges
 Wesley Newcomb Hohfeld
 Wild law
 Zechariah Chafee

 
Law